Champsochromis is a small genus of cichlid fishes endemic to Lake Malawi in east Africa.

Species
There are currently two recognized species in this genus:
 Champsochromis caeruleus (Boulenger, 1908)
 Champsochromis spilorhynchus (Regan, 1922)

References

 

Cichlid genera
Taxa named by George Albert Boulenger